The Khazar Lankaran 2012–13 season is Khazar Lankaran's eighth Azerbaijan Premier League season. Khazar Lankaran finished in 8th place in the league, after competing in the Relegation Championship during the second half of the season. They also reached the final of the Azerbaijan Cup, eventually losing to Neftchi Baku on penalties after a 0–0 draw. They competed in the 2012–13 UEFA Europa League, getting knocked out by Lech Poznań of Poland at the second qualifying round stage having previously defeated Nõmme Kalju of Estonia, 4–2, in the first qualifying round. Khazar started the season under Yunis Huseinov, until he resigned on 31 October 2012. Erik Roqueta Capilla was appointed as their caretaker manager on 1 November 2012. On 14 November 2012, Carles Martorell Baqués was appointed as the club's permanent manager, replacing caretaker manager Erik Roqueta Capilla. Baqués resigned as manager on 26 February 2013. On 8 March 2013 John Toshack was announced as the new manager, taking over from 15 March 2013.

Squad

 (captain)

Transfers

Summer

In:

Out:

.

Winter

In:

 

 
 

 

Out:

Competitions

Azerbaijan Premier League

Results summary

Results by round

Results

League table

Note 1: The match was originally played on 2 December 2012 but suspended in 54th minute at 1-1 due to fog. The remaining minutes were played the next day.

Azerbaijan Premier League Relegation Group

Results summary

Results by round

Results

Table

Azerbaijan Cup

Europa League

First qualifying round

Second qualifying round

Squad statistics

Appearances and goals

|-
|colspan="14"|Players who appeared for Khazar no longer at the club:

|}

Goal scorers

Disciplinary record

Team kit
These are the 2012–13 Khazar Lankaran kits.

|
|

References

External links 
 Khazar Lankaran at Soccerway.com

Khazar
Khazar Lankaran FK seasons